is an erotic one-shot manga by Naoki Yamamoto. The story has been included in a manga volume of the same title, as well as the anthology , both of which are anthologies of short, erotic one-shot manga by Yamamoto. The story has also been adapted into a film which was released in 2007.

List of manga
The short manga that are present in the anthology are:

Cast
 Honoka
 Akifumi Miura

References

External links
Page at Naoki Yamamoto's official site 
テレビばかり見てると馬鹿になる 

2000 manga
2007 films
Hentai anime and manga
2000s Japanese-language films
Live-action films based on manga
Japanese erotic drama films
Ohta Publishing manga
Seinen manga